John Michael Evans (born August 16, 1957) is a Canadian technology executive and the President of Alibaba Group. He previously spent 20 years working for U.S. investment bank Goldman Sachs and is a former Olympic rower.

Early life, family and education
Evans was born to Dr. John Robert Evans and his wife Jean. Besides his twin brother Mark, he has four other siblings: Derek, Gillian (Gill), Timothy (Tim), and Willa. He attended Upper Canada College in Toronto and received his bachelor's degree from Princeton University. He later studied at University College, Oxford where he rowed at the stroke oar for Oxford in the Oxford-Cambridge Boat Race. Alongside his twin brother Mark, Evans went on to join the Canadian Olympic team, where he won a gold medal in rowing at the 1984 Summer Games in Los Angeles.

Career
In 2015, Evans was appointed President of Alibaba Group, where he leads Alibaba Group’s international growth strategy outside of China  and reports to CEO Daniel Zhang. Evans has served on the board of Alibaba Group since its September 2014 IPO, and has known Alibaba Group founder Jack Ma since 1999 when Ma first approached Goldman Sachs regarding an early investment in the company. Evans was named as one of the National Retail Federation’s Power Players in 2019 for his work at Alibaba Group. In addition, Evans is currently a member of the Board of Directors of Barrick Gold Corporation and several not-for-profit organizations. He is also a trustee of the Asia Society and a member of the Advisory Council for the Bendheim Center for Finance at Princeton University.     

Before Alibaba Group, Evans was vice chairman of Goldman Sachs, chairman of Goldman Sachs Asia and spent 19 years as a Partner after joining the firm in 1993. In the high-profile IPO, Goldman was one of six lead underwriters with Mark Schwartz, chairman of Goldman Asia Pacific, named as lead banker for Goldman in a lead-up New York Times report. In 2019 Evans was charged for his involvement in the 1MDB scandal, which took place during his time at Goldman Sachs, which was settled.

Philanthropy
During the COVID-19 pandemic, Evans was personally involved in several philanthropic efforts to donate personal protective equipment (PPE) for healthcare workers in New York. New York Governor Andrew Cuomo acknowledged in a press briefing that Alibaba Group’s and Evans’ assistance had been “very helpful to us.”

See also
List of Princeton University Olympians
Mark Evans

References

1957 births
Living people
Alibaba Group people
Alumni of University College, Oxford
Canadian bankers
Canadian male rowers
Canadian people of Welsh descent
Goldman Sachs people
Medalists at the 1984 Summer Olympics
Olympic gold medalists for Canada
Olympic medalists in rowing
Olympic rowers of Canada
Oxford University Boat Club rowers
Princeton University alumni
Rowers at the 1984 Summer Olympics
Rowers from Toronto
Canadian twins
Twin sportspeople